The Johanneum is a 16th-century Renaissance building, originally named Stallgebäude because it was constructed as the royal mews. It is located at the Neumarkt in Dresden.

Today the Johanneum is home to the Dresden Transport Museum (Verkehrsmuseum Dresden), which displays vehicles of all modes of transport and their history.

History 

The Johanneum was built between 1586 and 1590 as the Stallgebäude, the stables of the adjacent Dresden Castle. Both horses and armoury collection of the Saxon dukes were housed here; two halls on the building's ground floor provided space for 128 horses. The upper floors were designed as collection rooms for the vast collection of princely armoury, wardrobe and utensils for pageants of the Dresden court. The Renaissance-era building was designed as one of the first autonoumus collection buildings in central Europe by Paul Buchner on behalf of Prince Elector Christian I of Saxony.

The upper floor dates back to 1730 and 1731, when on Augustus II the Strong's request, the building was converted into a guest house and later into a museum. The double-flight staircase was added in 1731. The royal painting collection was moved from the Dresden Castle to the Stallgebäude in 1747 and remained there until 1855.

After another building alteration between 1872 and 1876, the Stallgebäude was renamed the Johanneum, after the Saxonian King John (Johann in German). The Dresden Porcelain Collection was moved into the Johanneum in 1876, followed in 1877 by the Dresden Armory collection.

The building was severely damaged during the February 13, 1945 bombing of Dresden in World War II. Its reconstruction began in 1950, and the renovation of the facade was finished in 1960. Since this reconstruction, the Johanneum has been home to the Dresden Transport Museum.

Notes and references

External links
 
 Website of the Dresden Transport Museum

Museums in Dresden
Buildings and structures in Dresden
Rebuilt buildings and structures in Dresden